This is a list of listed buildings in Clackmannanshire. The list is split out by parish.

 List of listed buildings in Alloa, Clackmannanshire
 List of listed buildings in Alva, Clackmannanshire
 List of listed buildings in Clackmannan, Clackmannanshire
 List of listed buildings in Dollar, Clackmannanshire
 List of listed buildings in Muckhart, Clackmannanshire
 List of listed buildings in Tillicoultry, Clackmannanshire

Clackmannanshire